Kamandag (International title: Venom) is a Philippine television drama fantasy series broadcast by GMA Network. The series is based from the graphic novel of Carlo J. Caparas. Directed by Mark A. Reyes and Topel Lee, it stars Richard Gutierrez in the title role. It premiered on November 19, 2007 on the network's Telebabad line up. The series concluded on April 25, 2008 with a total of 113 episodes. It was replaced by Dyesebel in its timeslot.

Pre-production
The first project of Eula Valdez under GMA Network.

For Richard Gutierrez's preparation for the series, he trained under Ultimate Fighting Championship's Brandon Vera to master Muay Thai and Brazilian Jujitsu. The cast went to acting workshops at University of the East.

Cast and characters

Lead cast
 Richard Gutierrez as Vergel / Kamandag

Supporting cast
 Mark Anthony Fernandez as Lucero Serrano / Talim
 Jewel Mische as Jenny
 Maxene Magalona as Lily
 Ehra Madrigal / Anne Chennette T. Rodriguez (young) as Ditas / Denise / Lady Kamandag
 Eula Valdez / Glaiza de Castro (young) as Alicia
 Johnny Delgado as Budol
 Zoren Legaspi as Gulag
 Ariel Rivera as Abdon Serrano
 Ronaldo Valdez / Ramon Christopher Gutierrez (young) as Pepe
 Francine Prieto as Kuran
 Rainier Castillo as Ikoy
 Francis Magundayao as Boyong / Dagok
 Melissa Mendez as Elena
 Benjie Paras as Dinggol
 Elvis Gutierrez as Agol
 Pekto as Doro
 Gardo Versoza as Saban
 Emilio Garcia as Domeng
 Sunshine Dizon as Ragona

Guest cast
 Afi Africa as Afie
 Rhea Nakpil as Bea
 Renz Valerio as young Vergel
 Alessandra de Rossi as Eleanor
 Glydel Mercado as Vivian
 Michelle Madrigal as Eliza
 Bryan Revilla as Adlak
 Ram Revilla as Harn
 Maureen Larrazabal as Cathy
 Michael Flores as Sahir
 Dominic Roco as Pigo
 Karylle as Spectra
 Alyssa Alano as Reyna Baba
 Ynez Veneracion as Jaimee
 Saab Magalona as Eleanor's friend
 Kevin Santos as Randy
 Anne Chennette T. Rodriguez as young Ditas
 Sam Bumatay as young Baya

Ratings
According to AGB Nielsen Philippines' Mega Manila household television ratings, the pilot episode of Kamandag earned a 42.7% rating. While the final episode scored a 38.1% rating. The series had its highest rating on February 26, 2008 and March 7, 2008 with a 43.6% rating. The special, Ang Bagsik ni Kamandag garnered a 29.0% rating.

References

External links
 

2007 Philippine television series debuts
2008 Philippine television series endings
Fantaserye and telefantasya
Filipino-language television shows
GMA Network drama series
Television shows based on comics
Television shows set in the Philippines